Hopewell is an unincorporated community in Maury County, Tennessee. It lies at an elevation of 745 feet (227 m).

References

Unincorporated communities in Maury County, Tennessee
Unincorporated communities in Tennessee